IC, Ic, ic, or i.c. may stand for:

Computing
 Index of coincidence, in cryptography
 Integrated circuit, a set of electronic circuits on a semiconductor chip
 Interactive C, a programming language for robotic controllers
 Interconnection, physical linking of a telecommunication carrier's network

Language
 -ić or -ič, a family name suffix in South Slavic languages
 -ic, a suffix in English
 i.c., shorthand for in casu, Latin for 'in this case'
 ic, an Old English pronoun
 Christogram, combination of letters that forms an abbreviation for the name of Jesus Christ
Independent clause, a grammatical clause

Law
 IC codes, police shorthand expressions for apparent ethnicity
 Informed consent, in clinical trials the form that has to be signed by the patient (subject) before entering the study
 United States Intelligence Community, a group of government agencies

Schools
 Illinois College, Jacksonville, Illinois, US
 Imperial College London, UK
 International College, Beirut, Lebanon 
 Ithaca College, Ithaca, New York, US

Science
 Ice Ic, a metastable cubic crystalline variant of ice
 Index Catalogue, a nebula and other object catalogue used in astronomy
 Inferior colliculus, a part of the midbrain
 Intensive care medicine
 Interchangeable core, a type of lock cylinder
 Intermittent catheterisation, a method of relieving the bladder
 Interstitial cystitis, a disease
 Ion chromatography
 Ionization chamber, a type of radiation detector
 Irreducible complexity
 Isolation condenser, a passive cooling system for boiling water nuclear reactors
 Type Ic supernova, a subtype of Type I supernova
 IC, or collector current, in bipolar junction transistors
 Inhibitory Concentration, as in half maximal inhibitory concentration (IC50)
 Inspiratory capacity, a measure of lung volumes

Transportation
 IC Bus, a bus manufacturer
 Illinois Central Railroad (reporting mark IC)
 Indian Airlines (IATA airline designator IC)
 Intercités, classic long-distance passenger day and night train services in France operated by SNCF
 InterCity, certain long-distance passenger train services in Europe

Others
 Ingobamakhosi Carbineers, an infantry regiment of the South African Army
 Identity card
 Impuls IC, a German hang glider design
 Incident commander, person responsible for all aspects of an emergency response
 Indifference curve, in economics
 Industry Canada, a division of the Canadian government
 Information coefficient, in economics
 InterContinental, a hotel chain, or its parent company InterContinental Hotels Group
 Internal control, in accounting
 International Canoe, a powerful and fast single-handed sailing canoe
 Intimacy coordinator, staff member on theater, film and television productions
 Canary Islands (ISO 3166-1 code: IC)
 IC, postnominal letters for a member of the Rosminians, officially the Institute of Charity